The Pan-Philippine Highway, also known as the Maharlika Highway, is a network of roads, expressways, bridges, and ferry services that connect the islands of Luzon, Samar, Leyte, and Mindanao in the Philippines, serving as the country's principal transport backbone. The entire highway is designated as Asian Highway 26 (AH26) of the Asian Highway Network.

The northern terminus of the highway is in Laoag and the southern terminus is in Zamboanga City.

History 
The Pan-Philippine Highway System was an infrastructure program of President Diosdado Macapagal as a first priority project for the improvement and expansion of Philippine highway and land transport networks. It is a mixture of old existing roads and new roads that would be eventually added to become part of the highway. Government planners believed that the motorway and other connected roads would stimulate agricultural production by reducing transport costs, encourage social and economic development outside existing major urban centers such as Manila, and expand industrial production for domestic and overseas markets. Construction, which continued in the following decades, was supported by loans and grants from foreign aid institutions, including the World Bank. In 1979, the highway was renamed to Maharlika Highway.

The highway was rehabilitated and improved in 1997, during the administration of President Fidel V. Ramos, with assistance from the Japanese government, and dubbed the "Philippine-Japan Friendship Highway". In 1998, the Department of Tourism designated 35 sections of the highway as "Scenic Highways", with developed amenities for travelers and tourists.

Asian Highway Network
The Pan-Philippine Highway is designated as AH26 in the Asian Highway Network, a cooperative project which seeks to improve highway systems and standards across the continent. Ratified by the Philippines in 2007, it is currently the only highway in the system that is isolated from every other highway; island-based sections of the Asian Highway Network in Japan (AH1), Sri Lanka (AH43) and Indonesia (AH2) are all linked to the mainland sections by ferries to South Korea (AH1), India (Dhanushkodi), and Singapore, respectively.

Route description 

AH26 officially runs along the following thoroughfares:

  Manila North Road/Maharlika Highway: Laoag – Burgos – Aparri
  Bangag-Magapit Road: Aparri – Lal-lo
  Cagayan Valley Road: Lal-lo – Tuguegarao
  Maharlika Highway: San Pablo – Ilagan – Santiago – Solano – Bayombong – San Jose City – Cabanatuan – Gapan – San Miguel – Baliuag – Pulilan – Guiguinto
  North Luzon Expressway: Santa Rita Interchange, Guiguinto – Balintawak Interchange, Quezon City
  EDSA (Eastern Route): Balintawak Interchange, Quezon City – Magallanes Interchange, Makati
  South Luzon Expressway: Magallanes Interchange, Makati – Calamba Exit, Calamba 
  Skyway
  Maharlika Highway: Calamba – Santo Tomas – San Pablo – Tiaong – Candelaria – Sariaya – Tayabas
  Lucena Diversion Road: Tayabas – Lucena – Pagbilao
  Maharlika Highway: Pagbilao – Gumaca – Calauag – Daet – Milaor – Naga City – Daraga – Sorsogon City – Matnog
  Matnog–Allen ferry line: Luzon – Visayas (via San Bernardino Strait)

  Maharlika Highway: Allen – Calbayog – Catbalogan – Tacloban – Palo – Mahaplag – Liloan
  Liloan–Lipata ferry line: Visayas – Mindanao (via Bohol Sea)
  Maharlika Highway: Surigao City – Kitcharao
  Surigao-Butuan National Highway: Kitcharao – Butuan
  Davao-Agusan National Highway: Butuan – Bayugan – Tagum – Davao City
  J.P. Laurel Avenue: Davao City
  C.M. Recto Avenue: Davao City (one-way street)
  Davao–Cotabato Road: Davao City – Digos
  Digos-Makar Road: Digos – Malungon – General Santos
  Marbel-Makar Road: General Santos – Polomolok – Koronadal
  Cotabato-Marbel Road: Koronadal – Banga – Surallah – Norala 
  Isulan-Surallah Road: Isulan
  Marbel-Allah Valley-Cotabato Road: Isulan – Cotabato City
  Cotabato-Lanao Road: Cotabato City – Matanog
  Cotabato–Malabang–Lanao del Norte Road: Sultan Dumalondong – Picong, Lanao del Sur
  Maharlika Highway: Sultan Naga Dimaporo – Tukuran – Pagadian– Ipil – Tungawan – Zamboanga City

Auxiliary Routes

Alternatively, AH26 runs along the following thoroughfares:
Luzon
 EDSA (Western Route): Balintawak Interchange, Quezon City – Caloocan
 Samson Road: Caloocan
 Gen. San Miguel Street: Caloocan
 C-4 Road: Caloocan – Malabon – Navotas 
 R-10: Navotas
 Mel Lopez Boulevard: Manila
 Bonifacio Drive: Manila
 Roxas Boulevard: Manila – Pasay 
 EDSA (Western Route): Pasay – Magallanes Interchange, Makati

Visayas
 Palo–Carigara–Ormoc Road: Palo – Ormoc

  Ormoc–Cebu ferry line

Mindanao
 Bukidnon–Davao Road: Davao City – Quezon – Maramag
 Sayre Highway: Maramag – Malaybalay – Cagayan de Oro

Intersections
Ilocos Norte
 in Laoag. Northern terminus of AH26.
 in Bacarra

Cagayan
 in Abulug
 in Abulug
 at Magapit Interchange, Lal-lo
 in Tuguegarao
 in Tuguegarao
 in Tuguegarao
 in Tuguegarao

Isabela
 in Cabagan
 in Cauayan
 in Santiago
 in Cordon

Nueva Vizcaya
 in Bagabag
 in Aritao

Nueva Ecija
 in San Jose
 in Santo Domingo
 in Cabanatuan
 in Santa Rosa
 in Gapan

Bulacan

 in San Rafael
 in Pulilan
 in Plaridel
 in Santa Rita, Guiguinto. Route number change from N1 to E1.
 in Balagtas
 in Meycauayan

Metro Manila
 in Valenzuela
 at Smart Connect Interchange, Valenzuela
 in Unang Sigaw, Quezon City
 at Balintawak Interchange, Quezon City. Route number change from E1 to N1.
 in Unang Sigaw, Quezon City 
 in Muñoz, Quezon City
 in Diliman, Quezon City
 in Diliman, Quezon City
 in Diliman, Quezon City
 in Cubao, Quezon City
 near Camp Aguinaldo, Quezon City
 at Ortigas Interchange in Quezon City and Mandaluyong
 in Mandaluyong
 in Makati  
 in Makati  
 in Makati  
 at Magallanes Interchange, Makati. Route number change from N1 to E2.

 in Taguig
 in Taguig  
 in Parañaque and Muntinlupa 
 in Alabang, Muntinlupa 
 in Muntinlupa

Cavite
 in Carmona

Laguna (2nd segment) 
 in Biñan 
 in Santa Rosa
 in Calamba. Route number change from E2 to N1.

Batangas
 in Santo Tomas
 in Santo Tomas

Laguna (3rd segment)
 in San Pablo (two southern termini)

Quezon
 in Tiaong (northern terminus)
 in Tiaong
 in Tiaong (southern terminus)
 in Candelaria (western & eastern termini)
 in Isabang, Tayabas
 in Isabang, Lucena
 in Gulang-Gulang, Lucena
 in Talipan, Pagbilao
 in Silangang Malicboy, Pagbilao
 in Gumaca
 in Lopez
 in Lopez

Camarines Norte
 in Santa Elena
 in Labo
 in Daet (northern & southern termini)

Camarines Sur
 in Sipocot
 in Pamplona
 in Pili
 in Pili
 in Pili
 in Baao
 in Nabua
 in Bato

Albay
 in Polangui (two northern termini)
 in Ligao
 in Ligao
 in Daraga

Sorsogon
 in Pilar
 in Castilla
 in Sorsogon City (western terminus)
 in Sorsogon City
 in Sorsogon City (eastern terminus)
 in Bulan

Northern Samar
 in Allen

Samar
 in Calbayog
 in Calbayog
 in Gandara (northern & southern termini)
 in Catbalogan
 in Paranas
 in Basey
 in Santa Rita

Samar–Leyte boundary

 San Juanico Bridge

Leyte
 in Tacloban
 in Tacloban
 in Palo
 in Palo
 in Abuyog
 in Mahaplag

Southern Leyte
 in Sogod
 in Liloan
 in Liloan

Surigao del Norte
 in Surigao City
 in Placer

Agusan del Norte
 in Butuan

Agusan del Sur
 in Prosperidad
 in Prosperidad
 in San Francisco
 in Trento

Davao de Oro
 in Montevista
 in Nabunturan

Davao del Norte
 in Tagum (northern terminus)
 in Tagum
 in Tagum (southern terminus)
 in Carmen
 in Panabo

Davao del Sur
 in Buhawan, Davao City (eastern terminus)
 in Buhangin, Davao City
 in Agdao, Davao City (eastern terminus)
 in Agdao, Davao City
 in Agdao & Buhangin, Davao City
 in Poblacion, Davao City
 in Poblacion, Davao City
 in Poblacion, Davao City
 in Talomo, Davao City
 in Talomo, Davao City (western terminus)
 in Talomo, Davao City (western terminus)
 in Talomo, Davao City
 in Digos (northern terminus)
 in Digos
 in Digos
 in Digos (southern terminus)
 in Sulop

South Cotabato
 in General Santos (eastern terminus)
 in General Santos
 in General Santos
 in General Santos

Sultan Kudarat
 in Tacurong
 in Isulan
 in Esperanza

Maguindanao del Sur
 in Datu Saudi Ampatuan

Maguindanao del Norte
 in Sultan Kudarat
 in Datu Odin Sinsuat
 in Datu Odin Sinsuat

Lanao del Sur
 in Malabang

Zamboanga del Sur
 in Tukuran

Zamboanga Sibugay
 in Ipil

Zamboanga City

. Southern terminus of AH26.

Auxiliary routes

 in Balintawak, Quezon City. Northern terminus of AH26 auxiliary route in Metro Manila.
 in Caloocan. Route number change from N1 to N120.
 in Navotas
 in Navotas
 in Tondo, Manila
 in Tondo and San Nicolas, Manila
 in Ermita and Intramuros, Manila
 in Ermita, Manila
 in Ermita, Manila
 in Malate, Manila
 in Pasay
 in Pasay. Route number change from N120 to N1.
 in Pasay
 in Pasay
 at Magallanes Interchange, Makati. Southern terminus of AH26 auxiliary route in Metro Manila.

Visayas (western route) – part of 
 in Palo. Northern terminus of AH26 auxiliary route in Visayas.
 in Capoocan
 in Ormoc
 in Ormoc
 in Ormoc

Mindanao – part of 
 in Davao City. Southern terminus of AH26 auxiliary route in Mindanao.
 in Arakan
 in Maramag
 in Valencia
 in Cagayan de Oro. Northern terminus of AH26 auxiliary route in Mindanao.

See also
 Transportation in the Philippines
 Department of Public Works and Highways
 Asian Highway Network
 Philippine Nautical Highway System

Notes

Alternative names
Pan-Philippine Highway also has alternative names, especially locally within the poblacion of respective town and cities.

References

External links
Economy 

Roads in Luzon
Roads in Mindanao
Asian Highway Network
Roads in the Visayas